Avatha discolor  is a species of moth of the family Erebidae. It is found from the Indo-Australian and Pacific tropics to as far east as Henderson Island.

Description
Its wingspan is about 40–46 mm. Males with minutely ciliated antennae and subcostal neuration of forewings not distorted and without sexual patches on forewings and hindwings. Forewings are greyish and fuscous suffused. No spots on costa. The lunule on the antemedial line sometimes obsolescent. A dark spot found in the cell. The postmedial line "S-shaped" beyond the cell with a blackish patch in its upper curve. Hindwings with whitish cilia at apex and near anal angle.

Recorded food plants are Nephelium, Sapindus, and Callicarpa.

References

External links

Moths described in 1794
Avatha
Moths of Oceania